The CHA Most Valuable Player in Tournament was an annual award given out at the conclusion of the College Hockey America conference tournament to the best player in the championship as voted by the coaches of each CHA team.

The Most Valuable Player in Tournament was first awarded in 2000 and every year thereafter until 2010, when the CHA was disbanded when they could no longer retain their automatic bid to the NCAA Tournament.

Award winners

Winners by school

Winners by position

See also
CHA Awards
List of CHA Men's Ice Hockey Tournament champions

References

General

Specific

External links
CCHA Awards (Incomplete)

College ice hockey trophies and awards in the United States